

17001–17100 

|-id=002
| 17002 Kouzel ||  || Ivan U. Kouzel, ISEF awardee in 2003 || 
|-id=004
| 17004 Sinkevich ||  || Maksim M. Sinkevich, ISEF awardee in 2003 || 
|-id=019
| 17019 Aldo ||  || Aldo Tombelli (1921–2001), Italian amateur astronomer and father of co-discoverer Maura Tombelli || 
|-id=020
| 17020 Hopemeraengus ||  || Hope, Merope and Aengus, children of British discoverer Ian P. Griffin || 
|-id=022
| 17022 Huisjen ||  || Martin A. Huisjen (born 1944), American space scientist || 
|-id=023
| 17023 Abbott || 1999 EG || Bud Abbott (1897–1974), American vaudeville performer and film actor || 
|-id=024
| 17024 Costello ||  || Lou Costello (1906–1959), American actor, producer and comedian || 
|-id=025
| 17025 Pilachowski ||  || Catherine Anderson Pilachowski (born 1949), American astrophysicist at NOAO || 
|-id=029
| 17029 Cuillandre ||  || Jean-Charles Cuillandre (born 1968), French astronomer || 
|-id=030
| 17030 Sierks ||  || Holger Sierks (born 1960), German physicist || 
|-id=031
| 17031 Piethut ||  || Piet Hut (born 1952), Dutch astrophysicist || 
|-id=032
| 17032 Edlu ||  || Edward Tsang Lu (born 1963), a physicist specializing in solar physics. || 
|-id=033
| 17033 Rusty ||  || Rusty Schweickart (born 1935), American astronaut and pilot of the Apollo 9 lunar module || 
|-id=034
| 17034 Vasylshev ||  || Vasyl Shevchenko (born 1960), Ukrainian astronomer || 
|-id=035
| 17035 Velichko ||  || Fedor P. Velichko (1957–2013), Ukrainian astronomer, and director of Chuguev Observing Station || 
|-id=036
| 17036 Krugly ||  || Yurij N. Krugly (born 1962), Ukrainian astronomer || 
|-id=038
| 17038 Wake ||  || Nancy Wake (1912–2011), New Zealand journalist and British Special Operations Executive agent during WWII || 
|-id=039
| 17039 Yeuseyenka ||  || Yauhen A. Yeuseyenka, ISEF awardee in 2003 || 
|-id=040
| 17040 Almeida ||  || Liliane de Almeida, ISEF awardee in 2003 || 
|-id=041
| 17041 Castagna ||  || Pedro Turibeo Castagna, ISEF awardee in 2003 || 
|-id=042
| 17042 Madiraju ||  || Anila Madiraju, ISEF awardee in 2003, and IFAA recipient || 
|-id=044
| 17044 Mubdirahman ||  || Mubdi Rahman, ISEF awardee in 2003 || 
|-id=045
| 17045 Markert ||  || Thomas Henry Markert (1948–1996), an American astronomer who made some of the first x-ray observations of binary star systems, supernova remnants, suspected black holes and local group galaxies. He helped develop much of the instrumentation used on major x-ray observatories, including Einstein's FPCS and Chandra's HETG spectrometers. || 
|-id=046
| 17046 Kenway ||  || Gaetan Kristian Kenway, ISEF awardee in 2003 || 
|-id=049
| 17049 Miron ||  || Rachelle Elizabeth Miron, ISEF awardee in 2003 || 
|-id=050
| 17050 Weiskopf ||  || Lydia Suzanne Weiskopf, ISEF awardee in 2003 || 
|-id=051
| 17051 Oflynn ||  || Colin Patrick O'Flynn, ISEF awardee in 2003 || 
|-id=056
| 17056 Boschetti ||  || Carla Boschetti (born 1969), Italian astronomer of the University of Padua who studied the Seyfert galaxies || 
|-id=058
| 17058 Rocknroll ||  || Rock and Roll music † || 
|-id=059
| 17059 Elvis ||  || Elvis Presley (1935–1977), American Rock and Roll singer † || 
|-id=060
| 17060 Mikecombi ||  || Michael R. Combi (born 1952), American astrophysicist || 
|-id=061
| 17061 Tegler ||  || Stephen C. Tegler (born 1962), American astronomer || 
|-id=062
| 17062 Bardot ||  || Brigitte Bardot (born 1934), French actress and spokesperson for animal rights || 
|-id=063
| 17063 Papaloizou ||  || John Papaloizou (born 1947), British astrophysicist || 
|-id=066
| 17066 Ginagallant ||  || Gina May Gallant, ISEF awardee in 2003 || 
|-id=072
| 17072 Athiviraham ||  || Anand Athiviraham, ISEF awardee in 2003 || 
|-id=073
| 17073 Alexblank ||  || Alexander Edmund Blank, ISEF awardee in 2003 || 
|-id=075
| 17075 Pankonin ||  || Vernon Pankonin (born 1946), American radio astronomer || 
|-id=076
| 17076 Betti || 1999 HO || Enrico Betti (1823–1892), Italian mathematician, known for the topology of hyperspaces and Betti's theorem || 
|-id=077
| 17077 Pampaloni ||  || Carlo Pampaloni (born 1958), Italian amateur astronomer || 
|-id=078
| 17078 Sellers ||  || Peter Sellers (1925–1980), English film actor, comedian and singer || 
|-id=079
| 17079 Lavrovsky ||  || Vladislav Igorevich Lavrovsky, ISEF awardee in 2003 || 
|-id=081
| 17081 Jaytee ||  || Joseph T. Williams (born 1936), American engineer at the Multiple-Mirror Observatory on Mt. Hopkins, Arizona ("J. T." also appears in the provisional designation) || 
|-id=086
| 17086 Ruima ||  || Rui Ma, ISEF awardee in 2003 || 
|-id=088
| 17088 Giupalazzolo ||  || Giuseppe William Palazzolo, ISEF awardee in 2003 || 
|-id=089
| 17089 Mercado ||  || Jose Mercado, ISEF awardee in 2003 || 
|-id=090
| 17090 Mundaca ||  || Sebastian Mundaca, ISEF awardee in 2003 || 
|-id=091
| 17091 Senthalir ||  || P. Senthalir, ISEF awardee in 2003 || 
|-id=092
| 17092 Sharanya ||  || S. Sharanya, ISEF awardee in 2003 || 
|-id=095
| 17095 Mahadik ||  || Bhushan Prakash Mahadik, ISEF awardee in 2003 || 
|-id=097
| 17097 Ronneuman ||  || Ron Neuman, ISEF awardee in 2003 || 
|-id=098
| 17098 Ikedamai ||  || Mai Ikeda, ISEF awardee in 2003 || 
|-id=100
| 17100 Kamiokanatsu ||  || Natsumi Kamioka, ISEF awardee in 2003 || 
|}

17101–17200 

|-
| 17101 Sakenova ||  || Saule Sakenova, ISEF awardee in 2003 || 
|-id=102
| 17102 Begzhigitova ||  || Akmaral Begzhigitova, ISEF awardee in 2003 || 
|-id=103
| 17103 Kadyrsizova ||  || Zhibek Kadyrsizova, ISEF awardee in 2003 || 
|-id=104
| 17104 McCloskey ||  || Mairead Mary McCloskey, ISEF awardee in 2003 || 
|-id=108
| 17108 Patricorbett ||  || Patrick Kieran Corbett, ISEF awardee in 2003 || 
|-id=115
| 17115 Justiniano ||  || Miguel Angel Justiniano Lajara, ISEF awardee in 2003 || 
|-id=119
| 17119 Alexisrodrz ||  || Alexis Rodriguez, ISEF awardee in 2003 || 
|-id=121
| 17121 Fernandonido ||  || Fernando Javier Nido, ISEF awardee in 2003 || 
|-id=139
| 17139 Malyshev ||  || Denis Alexandrovich Malyshev, ISEF awardee in 2003 || 
|-id=156
| 17156 Kennethseitz ||  || Kenneth Seitz (born 1941) long-time director of Cantilena, a women's chorale in Arlington, Massachusetts || 
|-id=163
| 17163 Vasifedoseev ||  || Vasiliy G. Fedoseev, ISEF awardee in 2003 || 
|-id=166
| 17166 Secombe || 1999 MC || Harry Secombe (1921–2001), Welsh comedian and singer || 
|-id=167
| 17167 Olgarozanova || 1999 NB || Olga Rozanova (1886–1918), a Russian painter, illustrator and designer, who was a member of the avant-garde group Supremus, lead by Cubo-Futurist Kazimir Malevich. || 
|-id=169
| 17169 Tatarinov ||  || Andrew S. Tatarinov, ISEF awardee in 2003 || 
|-id=170
| 17170 Vsevustinov ||  || Vsevolod D. Ustinov, ISEF awardee in 2003 || 
|-id=173
| 17173 Evgenyamosov ||  || Evgeny A. Amosov, ISEF awardee in 2003 || 
|-id=176
| 17176 Viktorov ||  || Artem G. Viktorov, ISEF awardee in 2003 || 
|-id=179
| 17179 Codina ||  || Sayd Jose Codina Landaberry (born 1926), Uruguayan-Brazilian astronomer and director of the Rio de Janeiro Observatory (880) || 
|-id=184
| 17184 Carlrogers ||  || Carl Ransom Rogers (1902–1987), American psychologist || 
|-id=185
| 17185 Mcdavid ||  || David McDavid (born 1950), American astronomer || 
|-id=186
| 17186 Sergivanov ||  || Sergey O. Ivanov, ISEF awardee in 2003 || 
|-id=190
| 17190 Retopezzoli ||  || Reto Pezzoli (born 1959), Swiss amateur astronomer and friend of the discoverer Stefano Sposetti || 
|-id=192
| 17192 Loharu ||  || Evgeniy E. Loharu, ISEF awardee in 2003 || 
|-id=193
| 17193 Alexeybaran ||  || Alexey V. Baran, ISEF awardee in 2003 || 
|-id=195
| 17195 Jimrichardson ||  || James Richardson (born 1961), American astronomer || 
|-id=196
| 17196 Mastrodemos ||  || Nickolaos Mastrodemos (born 1964), astronomer || 
|-id=197
| 17197 Matjazbone ||  || Matjaz Bone, ISEF awardee in 2003 || 
|-id=198
| 17198 Gorjup ||  || Niko Gorjup, ISEF awardee in 2003 || 
|}

17201–17300 

|-
| 17201 Matjazhumar ||  || Matjaz Humar, ISEF awardee in 2003 || 
|-id=208
| 17208 Pokrovska ||  || Tzveta Dmitrieva Pokrovska, ISEF awardee in 2003 || 
|-id=211
| 17211 Brianfisher ||  || Brian Lee Fisher, ISEF awardee in 2003 || 
|-id=215
| 17215 Slivan ||  || Stephen Slivan (born 1962), American astronomer who demonstrated a preferential spin-vector alignment among Koronis family members. Known as "Slivan states", the discovery has led to a new understanding of thermal radiation forces on small bodies. || 
|-id=216
| 17216 Scottstuart ||  || Joseph Scott Stuart (born 1971), American astronomer || 
|-id=219
| 17219 Gianninoto || 2000 CV || Joe Gianninoto (born 1947), an avid amateur astronomer originally from New York, now living in Tucson, Arizona. || 
|-id=220
| 17220 Johnpenna ||  || John Penna, mentor at the ISTS in 2002 || 
|-id=222
| 17222 Perlmutter ||  || Frances Perlmutter, mentor at the ISTS in 2002 || 
|-id=224
| 17224 Randoross ||  || Randolph Ross, mentor at the ISTS in 2002 || 
|-id=225
| 17225 Alanschorn ||  || Alan Schorn, mentor at the ISTS in 2002 || 
|-id=233
| 17233 Stanshapiro ||  || Stan Shapiro, mentor at the ISTS in 2002 || 
|-id=240
| 17240 Gletorrence ||  || Glenda Torrence, mentor at the ISTS in 2002 || 
|-id=241
| 17241 Wooden ||  || Diane H. Wooden (born 1958), American astronomer || 
|-id=242
| 17242 Leslieyoung ||  || Leslie A. Young (born 1965), American astronomer || 
|-id=246
| 17246 Christophedumas ||  || Christophe Dumas (born 1968), a planetary scientist who is an expert in spectral and adaptive optics observations of asteroids and planets. || 
|-id=247
| 17247 Vanverst ||  || Mary VanVerst, mentor at the ISTS in 2002 || 
|-id=249
| 17249 Eliotyoung ||  || Eliot F. Young (born 1962), American astronomer || 
|-id=250
| 17250 Genelucas ||  || Gene A. Lucas (born 1946), American amateur astronomer || 
|-id=251
| 17251 Vondracek ||  || Mark Vondracek, mentor at the ISTS in 2002 || 
|-id=253
| 17253 Vonsecker ||  || Claire VonSecker, mentor at the ISTS in 2002 || 
|-id=257
| 17257 Strazzulla ||  || Giovanni Strazzulla (born 1951), Italian astrophysicist || 
|-id=258
| 17258 Whalen ||  || Patrice Whalen, mentor at the ISTS in 2002 || 
|-id=260
| 17260 Kušnirák ||  || Peter Kušnirák (born 1974), a prolific asteroid photometrist who has worked at Ondřejov since 1999. || 
|-id=262
| 17262 Winokur ||  || Bruce Winokur, mentor at the ISTS in 2002 || 
|-id=265
| 17265 Debennett ||  || David Edwyn Bennett, ISEF awardee in 2003 and European Union Contest for Young Scientists Award recipient. || 
|-id=269
| 17269 Dicksmith ||  || Dick Smith, Australian entrepreneur || 
|-id=270
| 17270 Nolthenius ||  || Richard Nolthenius (born 1952) is a Californian astronomer with publications on subjects as diverse as dark matter, galaxies, black holes, asteroids and climate change. A well-known teacher, he developed and runs Cabrillo College's observatory and astronomy program, and is a prolific observer of occultations in his spare time. || 
|-id=273
| 17273 Karnik ||  || Ryna Karnik, ISTS awardee in 2004, and ISEF awardee in 2003 || 
|-id=277
| 17277 Jarrydlevine ||  || Jarryd Brandon Levine, ISEF awardee in 2003 || 
|-id=278
| 17278 Viggh ||  || Herbert E. M. Viggh (born 1963), American astronomer || 
|-id=279
| 17279 Jeniferevans ||  || Jenifer B. Evans (born 1964), American astronomer || 
|-id=280
| 17280 Shelly ||  || Frank C. Shelly (born 1960), American astronomer || 
|-id=281
| 17281 Mattblythe ||  || Matthew S. Blythe (born 1960), American astronomer || 
|-id=283
| 17283 Ustinov ||  || Peter Ustinov (1921–2004), English actor, writer and filmmaker || 
|-id=285
| 17285 Bezout || 2000 NU || Étienne Bézout (1739–1783), French mathematician || 
|-id=286
| 17286 Bisei ||  || Bisei, Japanese town where the discovering Bisei Spaceguard Center is located || 
|}

17301–17400 

|-id=305
| 17305 Caniff || 4652 P-L || Milton Caniff (1907–1988), American cartoonist who created the comic strips Terry and the Pirates and Steve Canyon. His attention to detail gained him the title "the Rembrandt of Comics". The name was suggested by F. N. Bowman, who found the identification involving this minor planet. || 
|-id=314
| 17314 Aisakos || 1024 T-1 || Aesacus, Trojan prince in Greek mythology who was the son of Priam and Arisbe. Aisakos was a seer – as had also been his maternal grandfather, Merops – and said that Hecuba's future son would bring disaster to Troy. || 
|-id=351
| 17351 Pheidippos || 1973 SV || Pheidippos was a hero from Nisyros, in the Kalydnian islands. Son of king Thessalos, brother of Antiphos and grandson of Heracles, he fought against Telephos, king of Mysia || 
|-id=354
| 17354 Matrosov ||  || Vladimir Mefodievich Matrosov (born 1932), Russian physicist || 
|-id=356
| 17356 Vityazev ||  || Veniamin Vladimirovich Vityazev (born 1943), Russian astronomer and professor at Saint Petersburg University || 
|-id=357
| 17357 Lucataliano ||  || Luca Taliano (1999–2012) was a dear friend of the discoverer (Giovanni de Sanctis, Vincenzo Zappalà). || 
|-id=358
| 17358 Lozino-Lozinskij ||  || Gleb Eugenievich Lozino-Lozinskij (1909–2001), Russian engineer and designer of the MiG-105 EPOS orbital airplane and the Buran spaceplane || 
|-id=368
| 17368 Korn ||  || Andreas Korn (born 1972) is an astronomer at Uppsala University involved in outreach activities || 
|-id=369
| 17369 Eremeeva ||  || Alina Iosifovna Eremeeva (born 1929) is a historian of science who works at Moscow University's Sternberg Observatory. || 
|-id=399
| 17399 Andysanto || 1983 RL || Andrew G. Santo (born 1961), an American spacecraft engineer at the Applied Physics Laboratory of Johns Hopkins University. His diligent work as Spacecraft System Engineer throughout the development, launch and operations phases ensured the success of NEAR Shoemaker, NASA's initial "faster, better, cheaper" Discovery mission. || 
|}

17401–17500 

|-id=402
| 17402 Valeryshuvalov || 1985 UF || Valery Shuvalov (born 1952), the laboratory head at the Institute for Dynamics of Geospheres of the Russian Academy of Sciences in Moscow. || 
|-id=403
| 17403 Masciarelli ||  || Clodoveo Masciarelli (born 1955), a doctor, artist and amateur astronomer. || 
|-id=407
| 17407 Teige || 1987 TG || Karel Teige (1900–1952) was a graphic artist, leader and theoretician of the Czech art avantgarde. He served as a main Czech connection to French Surrealism, especially to Andre Breton. He was a co-founder of The Group of Surrealists in Czechoslovakia in 1934 || 
|-id=408
| 17408 McAdams ||  || Jim V. McAdams (born 1961) optimizes spacecraft trajectories at the Applied Physics Laboratory of Johns Hopkins University. He designed trajectories for the NEAR Shoemaker mission from the formative phase of NASA's Discovery Program in 1989 to landing on (433) Eros in 2001. || 
|-id=412
| 17412 Kroll || 1988 KV || Reinhold Kroll, of the Instituto de Astrofisica de Canarias, is known for his research on magnetic, chemically peculiar stars, particularly infrared observations of them. He was a fellow student of the discoverer at the University of Göttingen. || 
|-id=427
| 17427 Poe ||  || Edgar Allan Poe, 19th-century American author, master of the macabre and the mysterious || 
|-id=428
| 17428 Charleroi || 1989 DL || Charleroi, metropolis of Wallonia || 
|-id=431
| 17431 Sainte-Colombe || 1989 RT || Jean de Sainte-Colombe (1640–1700), a French composer and celebrated viola da gamba player, added a seventh string on the bass viol. A teacher of Marin Marais, he wrote more than 60 concertos for two viols and more than 170 pieces for the seven-string viol || 
|-id=435
| 17435 di Giovanni ||  || Alessio di Giovanni, Sicilian poet †  || 
|-id=437
| 17437 Stekene ||  || Stekene is a town in East-Flanders. Its church has a tower from the thirteenth century. || 
|-id=438
| 17438 Quasimodo ||  || Salvatore Quasimodo (1901–1968), an Italian novelist and poet, won the Nobel Prize for Literature in 1959. One of the foremost poets of the 20th century, he devoted himself to the translation of the Gospel of John, some of Catullus' cantos and several episodes from the Odyssey. || 
|-id=439
| 17439 Juliesan ||  || Julie Nelissen (1985–2017) was a dedicated nurse working at the Department of Psychiatry at the Stuivenberg clinic in the Antwerp region. || 
|-id=445
| 17445 Avatcha ||  || Avacha Bay, southeastern Kamchatka, used by Vitus Bering as a base during the expeditions that resulted in the discovery of Alaska, and where the French astronomer Louis Delisle de la Croyère is buried || 
|-id=446
| 17446 Mopaku ||  || The name Mopaku honors three assistants involved with the observations of minor planets at Kavular: Venkatachala Moorthy, Arvind Paranjpye and Kamatchiappan Kuppuswamy || 
|-id=447
| 17447 Heindl || 1990 HE || Clifford Heindl, deputy manager of JPL's Space and Earth Science Division 32 †  || 
|-id=452
| 17452 Amurreka ||  || The Amour river in Russia flows across northern Asia from the mountains of northeastern China to the Sea of Okhotsk. With a length of 4444 km, the Amurreka drains diverse landscapes of desert, steppe, tundra and taiga. The river forms the border between the Russian Far East and northeastern China || 
|-id=458
| 17458 Dick ||  || Wolfgang R. Dick, German astronomer and geodesist. || 
|-id=459
| 17459 Andreashofer ||  || Innkeeper Andreas Hofer (1767–1810) headed the Tyrolese popular rising against French occupation and was executed by a firing squad on order of Napoleon. His patriotic and heroic engagement is the subject of numerous dramatic plays, stories and poems, notably by Rosegger, Eichendorff and Koerner. || 
|-id=460
| 17460 Mang ||  || Herbert Mang (born 1942), professor of material sciences at the Vienna University of Technology. || 
|-id=461
| 17461 Shigosenger ||  || Shigosenger is a team of original characters introduced by Akashi Municipal Planetarium to promote astronomy education for children. The Planetarium is situated on the Japan Standard Time Meridian and "Shigosen" is a Japanese term for the meridian. || 
|-id=462
| 17462 Takahisa ||  || Takahisa Morita (born 1933) is a Japanese amateur astronomer who regularly opens his personal telescope to the public. He is particularly skilled at sunspot and prominence photography, and his images often grace the pages of Japanese astronomical magazines || 
|-id=465
| 17465 Inawashiroko ||  || Inawashiroko, one of the largest lakes in Japan, is located in Bandai-Asahi National Park. It is known for the clarity of its water, migrating swans and numerous swimming beaches. The town of Inawashiro on the north shore is the birthplace of bacteriologist Hideyo Noguchi || 
|-id=466
| 17466 Vargasllosa ||  || Mario Vargas Llosa (born 1936), a Peruvian writer. || 
|-id=470
| 17470 Mitsuhashi || 1991 BX || Yasuhiko Mitsuhashi, an amateur astronomer as well as a medical practitioner in Takamatsu City. || 
|-id=472
| 17472 Dinah || 1991 FY || Dinah, Alice's cat in Lewis Carroll's Alice's Adventures in Wonderland. || 
|-id=473
| 17473 Freddiemercury ||  || Freddie Mercury, British songwriter and lead singer for rock group Queen. || 
|-id=484
| 17484 Ganghofer ||  || Ludwig Ganghofer, German writer. || 
|-id=486
| 17486 Hodler ||  || Ferdinand Hodler (1853–1918) founded modern Swiss painting with his use of allegorical themes, historical events, sights of the Alps, lakes and portraits. His monumental 1907–1908 mural Marching out of the Jenense students in the war of liberation in 1813 adorns the aula of Jena University. || 
|-id=488
| 17488 Mantl ||  || Wolfgang Mantl (born 1939), professor of jurisprudence and constitutional law at the University of Graz. || 
|-id=489
| 17489 Trenker ||  || Luis Trenker (1892–1990), initially a herdsman, mountain guide and ski instructor in his South Tyrolese. || 
|-id=492
| 17492 Hippasos ||  || Hippasos, one of Priam's many sons. He supported Aeneas in the Trojan war. || 
|-id=493
| 17493 Wildcat || 1991 YA || University of Arizona sports teams (basketball, football, etc.) †  || 
|-id=494
| 17494 Antaviana ||  || Antaviana is a word created by the writer Pere Calders. It was suggested by students in honor of their school Antaviana, located at Barcelona, Spain, as a symbol of solidarity, responsibility, freedom and hope || 
|-id=496
| 17496 Augustinus ||  || Aurelius Augustinus (354–430), born in North Africa, converted to Christianity in Milan and was bishop of the antique town Hippo from 395. || 
|}

17501–17600 

|-
| 17501 Tetsuro || 1992 FG || Since retiring as principal of a junior high school "child astronomy club" sponsored by Kuroishi city, Tetsuro Fukushi (born 1936) has worked as a volunteer lecturer. Since 1998 he has worked to further the spread of astronomical activities for local citizens as vice president of the Kuroishi Subaru Association || 
|-id=502
| 17502 Manabeseiji ||  || Seiji Manabe (born 1947) was a project manager of the VLBI Exploration of Radio Astronomy, which led to the high-precision determination of trigonometric parallaxes for Galactic radio sources. He served as head of the Earth Rotation Division at the National Observatory of Japan and as director of Mizusawa Observatory || 
|-id=503
| 17503 Celestechild ||  || Celeste Ann Child, daughter of Jack and Maren Child, in recognition of her achievements in school, friendships and family, and her commitment to tolerance and compassion. || 
|-id=506
| 17506 Walschap ||  || Gerard Walschap (1898–1989), a Flemish writer and poet. || 
|-id=508
| 17508 Takumadan || 1992 JH || Takuma Dan, Japanese businessman †  || 
|-id=509
| 17509 Ikumadan || 1992 JR || Ikuma Dan, Japanese composer †  || 
|-id=516
| 17516 Kogayukihito ||  || Yukihito Koga (born 1959), the executive announcer at the broadcasting station in Fukuoka, is also very well known as an amateur astronomer and as an astronomical anchorperson in Kyushu. His main interests are comets, meteors, solar eclipses and deep-space observations || 
|-id=518
| 17518 Redqueen || 1992 YD || The Red Queen, character in Lewis Carroll's Through the Looking-Glass. Alice has some very strange experiences and conversations with her. || 
|-id=519
| 17519 Pritsak ||  || Omeljan Pritsak, Ukrainian-American cofounder of the Ukrainian Research Institute at Harvard University || 
|-id=520
| 17520 Hisayukiyoshio ||  || Yoshio Hisayuki (born 1942) founded the Ube astronomy club in Ube City, Yamaguchi Prefecture, Japan in 1968. He was the president of the club during 1968–1974 and again from 2006 to the present. Since 2006, he has served also as the director of the Ube Municipal Planetarium. || 
|-id=521
| 17521 Kiek ||  || Israël David Kiek, 19th-century Dutch photographer || 
|-id=543
| 17543 Sosva ||  || Sosva river, in western Siberia, a tributary of the Ob || 
|-id=544
| 17544 Kojiroishikawa ||  || Kojiro Ishikawa (born 1947), a Japanese amateur astronomer. || 
|-id=546
| 17546 Osadakentaro ||  || Kentaro Osada (born 1958), a Japanese amateur astronomer. || 
|-id=547
| 17547 Nestebovelli ||  || Neste Bovelli (1913–2015) was a professor of humanities, and passionate about literature, art and history. She was an active president of various cultural associations, and promoted and published many issues about art and the history of the city of Terni. || 
|-id=555
| 17555 Kenkennedy ||  || Kenneth Kennedy (born 1942) has been an active amateur astronomer in Scotland for fifty years. A retired senior hematologist, he has been Director of the BAA Aurora Section and has encouraged amateur collaboration in professional studies of aurora and polar mesospheric clouds || 
|-id=556
| 17556 Pierofrancesca || 1993 WB || Piero della Francesca (1416–1492) was an Italian Renaissance painter. || 
|-id=563
| 17563 Tsuneyoshi ||  || Tsuneyoshi Fujii, Japanese director of the Sunshine Planetarium in Tokyo, and earlier lecturer and curator at the Gotoh Planetarium and Astronomical Museum, also in Tokyo || 
|-id=567
| 17567 Hoshinoyakata || 1994 GP || Hoshi-no-Yakata is a public astronomical observatory in Kasuga city, Fukuoka, Japan. || 
|-id=579
| 17579 Lewkopelew ||  || Lev Kopelev (Лев Копелев, German spelling Lew Kopelew), Russian author and dissident, recipient of the Peace Prize of the Association of the German Book Trade || 
|-id=597
| 17597 Stefanzweig ||  || Stefan Zweig, 19th–20th-century Austrian biographer, essayist and writer || 
|-id=600
| 17600 Dobřichovice || 1995 SO || Dobřichovice, Czech municipality in Central Bohemia, the Czech Republic †  || 
|}

17601–17700 

|-
| 17601 Sheldonschafer || 1995 SS || Sheldon Schafer, professor of Astronomy at Bradley University, and Director Emeritus of the Lakeside Planetarium in Peoria, Illinois.  He built the world's largest scale model of the Solar System. || 
|-id=602
| 17602 Dr. G. ||  || Stephen Gottesman ("Dr. G.", born 1939), American radio astronomer at the University of Florida || 
|-id=603
| 17603 Qoyllurwasi ||  || Qoyllurwasi means "house of stars" in the Incan language, Quechua. The name was chosen to commemorate the fifth anniversary of the "Mutsumi Ishitsuka" National Planetarium of the Geophysical Institute of Peru. || 
|-id=606
| 17606 Wumengchao ||  || Wu Mengchao (1922–2021), academician of the Chinese Academy of Sciences, was an expert and pioneer on hepatosurgery. He established a unique system of liver surgery of China and led the development of hepatosurgery internationally. He won the China State Supreme Science and Technology Award in 2005 || 
|-id=607
| 17607 Táborsko || 1995 TC || Táborsko, Czech South Bohemian district, at the centre of which is Tábor †  || 
|-id=608
| 17608 Terezín || 1995 TN || Terezín (Theresienstadt) was established as a walled fortress and garrison town by Habsburgs in 1780. || 
|-id=611
| 17611 Jožkakubík ||  || Jožka Kubík III, Slovak gypsy musician †  || 
|-id=612
| 17612 Whiteknight ||  || The White Knight, character in Lewis Carroll's Through the Looking-Glass and what Alice found there. He often falls off his horse. He and the Red Knight fight to decide whose prisoner Alice shall be || 
|-id=615
| 17615 Takeomasaru ||  || Masaru Takeo (born 1947), one of the most well-known amateur astronomers in Ehime prefecture. || 
|-id=617
| 17617 Takimotoikuo ||  || Ikuo Takimoto (born 1954) became interested in astronomy after seeing a photograph of Comet Ikeya-Seki. He now photographs sunspots and solar prominences, in both white light and H-®, at the private observatory he completed in 1988. || 
|-id=625
| 17625 Joseflada ||  || Josef Lada, Czech painter †  || 
|-id=627
| 17627 Humptydumpty ||  || Humpty-Dumpty, character in a Mother Goose rhyme, whose head and body together are egg-shaped. He is not only the subject of one of the most famous nursery rhymes in English but also a major character in Lewis Carroll's Alice's Adventures in Wonderland. He tells Alice a lot about the meaning of words, including the strange ones in the poem "Jabberwocky". || 
|-id=629
| 17629 Koichisuzuki ||  || Koichi Suzuki (born 1955) became a member of the Nanyo Astronomy Lovers Club in 1993 and actively and eagerly spreads astronomical knowledge || 
|-id=637
| 17637 Blaschke ||  || Wilhelm Blaschke (1885–1962) was an  Austro-Hungarian mathematician and instrumental in establishing the University of Hamburg as an important center of mathematical research. His own research centered on differential and integral geometry and kinematics, and he laid the foundations of topological differential geometry. || 
|-id=638
| 17638 Sualan ||  || Sue and Alan French, American amateur astronomers †  || 
|-id=640
| 17640 Mount Stromlo ||  || Mount Stromlo Observatory †  || 
|-id=645
| 17645 Inarimori ||  || The Inarimori ancient burial mound is located in the south of Nanyo city, Yamagata prefecture. It has a square front and a circular main part, constructed in the latter part of the fourth century. It was the tomb of a chief in the ancient Okitama province (southern part of Yamagata prefecture) || 
|-id=649
| 17649 Brunorossi ||  || Bruno Rossi (1905–1993) was a physicist who worked on the Manhattan Project and was a pioneer of X-ray astronomy. || 
|-id=651
| 17651 Tajimi ||  || Tajimi, the city in Gifu prefecture where the first discoverer lives and where this minor planet was discovered.  || 
|-id=652
| 17652 Nepoti ||  || Giuliano Nepoti (born 1949), an enthusiastic amateur astronomer, is a dear friend of the discoverer. || 
|-id=653
| 17653 Bochner ||  || Salomon Bochner, Polish-American mathematician †  || 
|-id=656
| 17656 Hayabusa ||  || The minor-planet explorer, Hayabusa (MUSES-C) was developed by JAXA/ISAS and launched in 2003. It traveled to (25143) Itokawa to capture samples of surface material. After overcoming many critical difficulties, Hayabusa finally returned to the earth in 2010, with fragments of surface material. || 
|-id=657
| 17657 Himawari ||  || Himawari, which means "sunflower", is the name of a series of Japanese weather satellites. Himawari-1 was launched in 1977, and the latest, Himawari-7, was launched in 2006 || 
|-id=670
| 17670 Liddell ||  || Alice Pleasance Liddell (1852–1934) was a young English girl, then aged 10, and Lewis Carroll's inspiration for the heroine of Alice's Adventures in Wonderland. The name was suggested by J. Meeus. || 
|-id=673
| 17673 Houkidaisen ||  || Houki Daisen, the highest peak in the Chugoku district of Tottori prefecture. || 
|-id=681
| 17681 Tweedledum ||  || Tweedledum, character in Lewis Carroll's Through the Looking-Glass. When Alice meets him, he is standing under a tree with his arm round his brother's neck. Like his twin Tweedledee, he gives his name to a minor planet of Hungaria type. || 
|-id=683
| 17683 Kanagawa ||  || Kanagawa prefecture, where Hadano Observatory is situated †  || 
|-id=693
| 17693 Wangdaheng ||  || Wang Daheng (1915–2011), research professor, director and honorary director of Changchun Institute of Optics and Fine Mechanics, is one of the founders of optical science and technology in China || 
|-id=694
| 17694 Jiránek ||  || Vladimír Jiránek, Czech cartoonist †  ‡  || 
|-id=696
| 17696 Bombelli ||  || Rafael Bombelli (1526–1572), Italian mathematician of Bologna, known for his treatise on algebra introduced a consistent procedure for handling imaginary complex numbers, removing some of the mystery from the so-called irreducible case of the solution of the cubic equation. || 
|-id=697
| 17697 Evanchen ||  || Evan Matthew Chen (born 1993), ISTS awardee in 2012 || 
|-id=698
| 17698 Racheldavis ||  || Rachel Michelle Davis (born 1993), ISTS awardee in 2012 || 
|-id=700
| 17700 Oleksiygolubov ||  || Oleksiy Golubov (born 1985) has changed our understanding of the YORP effect via his theory of Tangential YORP, which helps explain the measured spin evolution of asteroids. His current work has identified several new equilibrium states for binaries, leading to important new predictions for how these bodies dynamically evolve. || 
|}

17701–17800 

|-id=702
| 17702 Kryštofharant || 1997 JD || Kryštof Harant (1564–1621), Czech nobleman, soldier, writer and composer || 
|-id=703
| 17703 Bombieri ||  || Enrico Bombieri (born 1940), an Italian mathematician || 
|-id=712
| 17712 Fatherwilliam ||  || Father William, character in Lewis Carroll's Alice's Adventures in Wonderland. || 
|-id=720
| 17720 Manuboccuni ||  || Emanuele Boccuni (born 1969), Italian composer of new age music || 
|-id=734
| 17734 Boole ||  || George Boole, English mathematician and philosopher. || 
|-id=737
| 17737 Sigmundjähn ||  || Sigmund Jähn (1937–2019), the first German cosmonaut || 
|-id=744
| 17744 Jodiefoster ||  || Jodie Foster, American actress and director. || 
|-id=746
| 17746 Haigha ||  || Haigha, character in Lewis Carroll's Through the Looking-Glass. || 
|-id=748
| 17748 Uedashoji || 1998 CL || Ueda Shoji (1913–2000), a professional Japanese photographer || 
|-id=759
| 17759 Hatta ||  || Hatta, one of the king's two messengers, one to fetch and one to carry, in Lewis Carroll's Through the Looking-Glass || 
|-id=764
| 17764 Schatzman ||  || Évry Schatzman (1920–2010), a French astrophysicist || 
|-id=768
| 17768 Tigerlily ||  || the Tiger-Lily, one of the Live Flowers in Lewis Carroll's Through the Looking-Glass. || 
|-id=770
| 17770 Baumé ||  || Antoine Baumé (1728–1804), a French chemist || 
|-id=771
| 17771 Elsheimer ||  || Adam Elsheimer (1578–1610), a German painter || 
|-id=776
| 17776 Troska ||  || Jan Matzal Troska (1881–1961), Czech science-fiction author || 
|-id=777
| 17777 Ornicar ||  || In elementary school French children often learn the sequence mais ou et donc or ni car, which are the conjunctions that link phrases. || 
|-id=779
| 17779 Migomueller ||  || Michael "Migo" Mueller (born 1974), German physicist and infrared minor planet astronomer || 
|-id=781
| 17781 Kepping ||  || Ashley Deane Kepping, ISEF awardee in 2003 || 
|-id=784
| 17784 Banerjee ||  || Sudeep Banerjee, ISEF awardee in 2003 || 
|-id=785
| 17785 Wesleyfuller ||  || Wesley Ryan Fuller, ISEF awardee in 2003, and MILSET Expo-Sciences International Award recipient || 
|-id=794
| 17794 Kowalinski ||  || Blair Elisabeth Kowalinski, ISEF awardee in 2003, and MILSET Expo-Sciences International Award recipient || 
|-id=795
| 17795 Elysiasegal ||  || Elysia Segal (born 1985), ISEF awardee in 2003 || 
|-id=799
| 17799 Petewilliams ||  || Peter McLane Williams, ISEF awardee in 2003 || 
|}

17801–17900 

|-
| 17801 Zelkowitz ||  || Rachel Lauren Zelkowitz, ISEF awardee in 2003 || 
|-id=803
| 17803 Barish ||  || Robert David Barish, ISEF awardee in 2003 || 
|-id=805
| 17805 Švestka ||  || Zdeněk Švestka (1925–2013), Czech astronomer, expert on solar physics, and editor of the journal Solar Physics. || 
|-id=806
| 17806 Adolfborn ||  || Adolf Born (1930–2016), Czech painter and illustrator, caricaturist and film-maker || 
|-id=807
| 17807 Ericpearce ||  || Eric C. Pearce (born 1961), site manager for the Lincoln Near-Earth Asteroid Research (LINEAR) at the Lincoln Laboratory's Experimental Test Site near Socorro, New Mexico || 
|-id=815
| 17815 Kulawik ||  || Christopher Eric Kulawik, ISEF awardee in 2003 || 
|-id=821
| 17821 Bölsche ||  || Wilhelm Bölsche (1861–1939), German naturalist, poet and writer (Src) || 
|-id=823
| 17823 Bartels || 1998 GA || Mel Bartels (born 1954), American amateur astronomer and open source software developer for altazimuth telescopes (Src) || 
|-id=826
| 17826 Normanwisdom ||  || Sir Norman Wisdom (1915–2010), English comedian, singer and actor, best known for his smash hit films of the 1950s as the downtrodden, accident-prone little man in the shrunken suit and skewhiff cap. A physical comedian, Wisdom did his trademark trip-up on the red carpet after being knighted by the Queen. || 
|-id=831
| 17831 Ussery ||  || Robert Francis Ussery, ISEF awardee in 2003 || 
|-id=832
| 17832 Pitman ||  || Ellen Marie Pitman, ISEF awardee in 2003 || 
|-id=835
| 17835 Anoelsuri ||  || A. Noel Suri, ISEF awardee in 2003 || 
|-id=836
| 17836 Canup ||  || Robin Canup (born 1968), American astronomer || 
|-id=842
| 17842 Jorgegarcia ||  || Felix Javier Jorge-Garcia, ISEF awardee in 2003 || 
|-id=844
| 17844 Judson ||  || Michael Ivan Judson, ISEF awardee in 2003 || 
|-id=851
| 17851 Kaler || 1998 JK || James B. Kaler, American astronomer and author †  || 
|-id=853
| 17853 Ronaldsayer ||  || Ronald W. Sayer (born 1967), American data analyst for the Lincoln Near-Earth Asteroid Research program || 
|-id=855
| 17855 Geffert || 1998 KK || Martin Geffert (1922–2015), German amateur astronomer at Starkenburg Observatory || 
|-id=856
| 17856 Gomes ||  || Rodney Gomes da Silva (born 1954), astronomer || 
|-id=857
| 17857 Hsieh ||  || Henry H. Hsieh (born 1978), American astronomer who studied 7968 Elst-Pizarro and other comet-like asteroid of the asteroid belt || 
|-id=858
| 17858 Beaugé ||  || Cristián Beaugé (born 1963), Argentinian astronomer || 
|-id=859
| 17859 Galinaryabova ||  || Galina O. Ryabova (born 1955), Russian astronomer || 
|-id=860
| 17860 Roig ||  || Fernando Roig (born 1968), astronomer and dynamicist at the National Observatory in Brazil. He is known for his results on the depletion of the asteroid belt's Hecuba gap and his HCM analysis of Jupiter trojans. || 
|-id=869
| 17869 Descamps ||  || Pascal Descamps (born 1961), a French astronomer who works at the "Institut de mécanique céleste et de calcul des éphémérides" in Paris on the modeling the Galilean satellites of Jupiter, with particular application to observations of their mutual phenomena. He has also studied the volcanoes on the satellite Io and has worked on the Uranian system using adaptive optics. || 
|-id=879
| 17879 Robutel ||  || Philippe Robutel (born 1964), a French astronomer who works at the "Institut de mécanique céleste et de calcul des éphémérides" in Paris on the stability of the three-body problem, especially on the existence of quasiperiodic motions for the application of KAM theory. || 
|-id=881
| 17881 Radmall ||  || Nelson Bret Radmall, ISEF awardee in 2003 || 
|-id=882
| 17882 Thielemann ||  || John Seth Thielemann, ISEF awardee in 2003 || 
|-id=883
| 17883 Scobuchanan ||  || Scott Sheldon Buchanan, ISEF awardee in 2003 || 
|-id=884
| 17884 Jeffthompson ||  || Jeff Thompson, ISEF awardee in 2003 || 
|-id=885
| 17885 Brianbeyt ||  || Brian James Beyt, ISEF awardee in 2003 || 
|-id=889
| 17889 Liechty ||  || Anthony David Liechty, ISEF awardee in 2003 || 
|-id=891
| 17891 Buraliforti || 1999 EA || Cesare Burali-Forti (1861–1931), an Italian mathematician who taught at the Military Academy in Turin. He discovered a paradox in Cantor's set theory: since the ordinal number of a set of ordinals is greater than the ordinal of each set element, "the ordinal of the set of all ordinals" is a self-contradictory concept. || 
|-id=892
| 17892 Morecambewise ||  || Morecambe and Wise, British comic double act Eric Morecambe (1926–1984) and Ernie Wise (1925–1999) teamed up in the 1940s to create Britain's finest stage double act and later became TV favorites. Eric, `the one with the glasses', was known for his witty retorts, giving slaps to the cheeks of Ernie for plays `what he wrote'. || 
|-id=893
| 17893 Arlot || 1999 FO || Jean-Eudes Arlot (born 1948), a French astronomer and current director of the "Institut de mécanique céleste et de calcul des éphémérides" in Paris and chair of the IAU Commission 20 working group on satellites. He has worked on a theory of the motions of Jupiter's Galilean satellites and organised international campaigns to observe the mutual phenomena of these bodies. || 
|-id=897
| 17897 Gallardo ||  || Tabaré Gallardo (born 1962), Uruguayan astronomer and dynamicist || 
|-id=898
| 17898 Scottsheppard ||  || Scott S. Sheppard (born 1977), American astronomer and discoverer of minor planets || 
|-id=899
| 17899 Mariacristina ||  || Maria Cristina De Sanctis (born 1967), Italian astronomer || 
|-id=900
| 17900 Leiferman ||  || Adam James Leiferman, ISEF awardee in 2003 || 
|}

17901–18000 

|-id=902
| 17902 Britbaker ||  || Brittany Baker, ISEF awardee in 2003 || 
|-id=904
| 17904 Annekoupal ||  || Anne Elizabeth Koupal, ISEF awardee in 2003 || 
|-id=905
| 17905 Kabtamu ||  || Mahlet Kabtamu, ISEF awardee in 2003 || 
|-id=907
| 17907 Danielgude ||  || Daniel Moises Gude, ISEF awardee in 2003 || 
|-id=908
| 17908 Chriskuyu ||  || Christopher Ku Yu, ISEF awardee in 2003 || 
|-id=909
| 17909 Nikhilshukla ||  || Nikhil Atul Shukla, ISEF awardee in 2003 || 
|-id=910
| 17910 Munyan ||  || Benjamin Kendrick Munyan, ISEF awardee in 2003 || 
|-id=914
| 17914 Joannelee ||  || Joanne June Lee, ISEF awardee in 2003 || 
|-id=917
| 17917 Cartan ||  || Élie Cartan (1869–1951), a French mathematician whose major contribution is the development of the theory of exterior differential forms, which he applied to the study of Lie groups, differential geometry and systems of differential equations. || 
|-id=919
| 17919 Licandro ||  || Javier Licandro (born 1966), an Uruguayan astronomer at the Isaac Newton Telescope at the Roque de los Muchachos Observatory on La Palma, who works on the physical properties of minor bodies and trans-Neptunian objects. || 
|-id=920
| 17920 Zarnecki ||  || John Zarnecki (born 1949), a British astronomer of the Open University, Milton Keynes, who has developed spacecraft instrumentation to study the surfaces and atmospheres of planets, satellites and small bodies. He is a PI for the Huygens probe/lander on the Cassini mission to Saturn and Saturn VI (Titan). || 
|-id=921
| 17921 Aldeobaldia ||  || Anna Lisa De Obaldia, ISEF awardee in 2003, and IFAA recipient || 
|-id=925
| 17925 Dougweinberg ||  || Douglas Stanley Weinberg, ISEF awardee in 2003 || 
|-id=926
| 17926 Jameswu ||  || James Y. W. Wu, ISEF awardee in 2003 || 
|-id=927
| 17927 Ghoshal ||  || Shivani Ghoshal, ISEF awardee in 2003 || 
|-id=928
| 17928 Neuwirth ||  || Melissa Marie Neuwirth, ISEF awardee in 2003 || 
|-id=930
| 17930 Kennethott ||  || Kenneth Richard Ott, ISEF awardee in 2003 || 
|-id=932
| 17932 Viswanathan ||  || Nitya Kalyani Viswanathan, ISEF awardee in 2003 || 
|-id=933
| 17933 Haraguchi ||  || Whitney Takeo Haraguchi, ISEF awardee in 2003 || 
|-id=934
| 17934 Deleon ||  || Christopher Lee DeLeon, ISEF awardee in 2003 || 
|-id=935
| 17935 Vinhoward ||  || Vincent Michael Howard, ISEF awardee in 2003 || 
|-id=936
| 17936 Nilus ||  || Nilus, son of Oceanus and Tethys, is the personified god of the river Nile in classical mythology. The annual ebb and flow of the Nile sparked the advent of agriculture and farming around 6500 years ago. This inexorably led to the development of an ancient Egyptian civilization that was a keystone for those that followed. || 
|-id=938
| 17938 Tamsendrew ||  || Tamsen Alicia Drew, ISEF awardee in 2003, and IFAA recipient || 
|-id=940
| 17940 Kandyjarvis ||  || Kandy S. Jarvis (born 1966) is a geologist who has made seminal contributions to solar system object composition science and supported human space flight endeavors. She was a primary investigator and writer of the Columbia accident Crew Survival Report || 
|-id=941
| 17941 Horbatt ||  || Paul Allen Horbatt (born 1946), a skilled mechanical craftsman who has contributed greatly to the development of the instrumentation at Goodricke-Pigott Observatory, near Tucson, where this minor planet was discovered. His familiarity with detector enclosures and vacuum seals greatly speeded the fabrication of the instruments || 
|-id=942
| 17942 Whiterabbit ||  || The White Rabbit, character in Lewis Carroll's Alice's Adventures in Wonderland. When Alice hears the Rabbit (who, of course, has pink eyes) talking to itself, she follows it down a huge rabbit-hole under a hedge, and her adventures begin. The name was suggested by T. Urata, and the citation was prepared by R. E. Asher. || 
|-id=945
| 17945 Hawass ||  || Zahi Hawass (born 1947), an Egyptian archeologist who showed unfailing dedication in the battle of preserving Egypt's monuments and antiquities. He has also been involved in many important discoveries such as the pyramid builder's necropolis at Giza and golden mummies of El Bahariya Oasis. || 
|-id=950
| 17950 Grover ||  || Vaishali Kiran Grover, ISEF awardee in 2003 || 
|-id=951
| 17951 Fenska ||  || Kristen Elaine Fenska, ISEF awardee in 2003 || 
|-id=952
| 17952 Folsom ||  || Jean Marie Folsom, ISEF awardee in 2003 || 
|-id=954
| 17954 Hopkins ||  || Brandon James Hopkins, ISEF awardee in 2003 || 
|-id=955
| 17955 Sedransk ||  || Kyra Lauren Sedransk, ISEF awardee in 2003 || 
|-id=956
| 17956 Andrewlenoir ||  || Andrew Allen Lenoir, ISEF awardee in 2003 || 
|-id=958
| 17958 Schoof ||  || Jenna Marie Schoof, ISEF awardee in 2003 || 
|-id=959
| 17959 Camierickson ||  || Camille Sara Myerchin Erickson, ISEF awardee in 2003 || 
|-id=960
| 17960 Liberatore ||  || Katie Lynn Liberatore, ISEF awardee in 2003 || 
|-id=961
| 17961 Mariagorodnitsky ||  || Maria Gorodnitsky, ISEF awardee in 2003 || 
|-id=962
| 17962 Andrewherron ||  || Andrew Jared Herron, ISEF awardee in 2003 || 
|-id=963
| 17963 Vonderheydt ||  || Molly von der Heydt, ISEF awardee in 2003 || 
|-id=965
| 17965 Brodersen ||  || Carl Harold Brodersen, ISEF awardee in 2003 || 
|-id=967
| 17967 Bacampbell ||  || Blake Allen Campbell, ISEF awardee in 2003 || 
|-id=969
| 17969 Truong ||  || Gold Silver Truong, ISEF awardee in 2003 || 
|-id=970
| 17970 Palepu ||  || Sita Chandrika Palepu, ISEF awardee in 2003 || 
|-id=971
| 17971 Samuelhowell ||  || Samuel James Amberson Howell, ISEF awardee in 2003 || 
|-id=972
| 17972 Ascione ||  || Andrew Gerard Ascione, ISEF awardee in 2003, and European Union Contest for Young Scientists Award recipient. || 
|-id=976
| 17976 Schulman ||  || Aaron David Schulman, ISEF awardee in 2003, and European Union Contest for Young Scientists Award recipient. || 
|-id=980
| 17980 Vanschaik ||  || Katherine Douglas Van Schaik, ISEF awardee in 2003 || 
|-id=982
| 17982 Simcmillan ||  || Simeon McMillan, ISTS awardee in 2004, and ISEF awardee in 2003 || 
|-id=983
| 17983 Buhrmester ||  || Michael Duane Buhrmester, ISEF awardee in 2003 || 
|-id=984
| 17984 Ahantonioli ||  || Alexandra Hope Antonioli, ISEF awardee in 2003 || 
|-id=988
| 17988 Joannehsieh ||  || Joanne Charlotte Hsieh, ISEF awardee in 2003 || 
|-id=991
| 17991 Joshuaegan ||  || Joshua Harris Egan, ISEF awardee in 2003 || 
|-id=992
| 17992 Japellegrino ||  || Jason Scott Pellegrino, ISEF awardee in 2003 || 
|-id=993
| 17993 Kluesing ||  || Daniel Lennard Kluesing, ISEF awardee in 2003 || 
|-id=995
| 17995 Jolinefan ||  || Joline Marie Fan, ISEF awardee in 2003, and IFAA recipient || 
|}

References 

017001-018000